Ichneumenoptera commoni is a moth of the family Sesiidae which was described by W. Donald Duckworth and Thomas Drake Eichlin in 1974. It is known only from the male type which was collected near Toowoomba in Queensland, Australia.

The length of the forewings is about 8.5 mm for males.

External links
Australian Faunal Directory
Classification of the Superfamily Sesioidea (Lepidoptera: Ditrysia) 
New records and a revised checklist of the Australian clearwing moths (Lepidoptera: Sesiidae)

Moths of Australia
Sesiidae
Moths described in 1974